SITC may refer to:

 Smuggling Interdiction and Trade Compliance, a small, nationwide program within the United States Department of Agriculture, implemented to detect and stop the smuggling of agricultural commodities
 Social in the City, fan events in Birmingham (Winter Edition since 2019) and London (Summer Edition since 2020)
 Society for Immunotherapy of Cancer, a professional society for advancing the science and application of cancer immunotherapy
 Standard International Trade Classification, a classification of goods used to classify the exports and imports of a country to enable comparing different countries and years
 Summer in the City (event), an annual YouTube fan event in London (2009…2019)